Cwm Wanderers Association Football Club is an amateur Welsh football team based in Swansea, Wales. They play in the West Wales Premier League which is in the fourth tier of the Welsh football league system. They have a long history of success in the Neath & District League, being the most successful club in that league, winning the top flight title sixteen times.

History
The club was founded in 1931. The most successful period in the club's history was the 1970s when the club won the league title six times in seven years.

Honours
Neath & District League Premier Division – Champions (16): 1951–52; 1952–53; 1962–63; 1963–64; 1965–66; 1966–67; 1970–71; 1971–72; 1972–73; 1973–74; 1974–75; 1976–77; 1989–90; 1990–91; 1994–95; 2016–17

References

External links
Club official twitter
Club official facebook

Football clubs in Wales
West Wales Premier League clubs
Neath & District League clubs
Sport in Swansea
Association football clubs established in 1931
1931 establishments in Wales
Football clubs in Swansea